Joel Eduardo Qwiberg (born October 9, 1992) is a Swedish former professional footballer.

Career

Sweden
Qwiberg's career began in Sweden at FC Gute (youth team Klintehamns ik), in the fourth-tier Division 2 league Södra Svealand. In January 2012, he moved up to the third-tier league in Sweden, Division 1 Norra, to play for Vasalunds IF, where he made 43 appearances and scored two goals. He was loaned to FC Den Bosch, in the Netherlands' second-tier Eerste Divisie, in July 2014, but returned to Vasalunds the following February after recording only one appearance for the Dutch club. Qwiberg played for Vasalunds for one more year, before transferring to Division 1 side IF Brommapojkarna in January 2016.

During his first season at Brommapojkarna, Qwiberg served as part of the league's best defense, posting an average of 0.65 goals per game, and helped the club see both a championship victory and a promotion to Superettan, Sweden's second-tier league, following a 19-1-6 season. In his second season, BP won the championship again and was again promoted, this time to Sweden's top-tier Allsvenskan league. However, Qwiberg would not experience his first season of top-tier football with BP.

Major League Soccer
On December 1, 2017, the San Jose Earthquakes, of the top-tier American league MLS, announced that they had signed Qwiberg on a free transfer to a multi-year contract. According to a quote by general manager Jesse Fioranelli in the club's statement about his signing, Qwiberg had been "pursued by several first-division clubs in Sweden and other parts of Europe". His signing came shortly after San Jose hired Swedish coach Mikael Stahre from Allsvenskan club BK Häcken in November 2017. He made his MLS debut on 7 April 2018 in a 1-1 draw with the Philadelphia Union, starting the match and playing 58 minutes before substituting out for Shea Salinas.

Qwiberg parted ways with San Jose on March 2, 2019.

Reno 1868 FC
Qwiberg appeared briefly on loan with San Jose's USL affiliate Reno 1868, starting against San Antonio on May 26, 2018.

Back to Sweden
On 1 April 2019, Qwiberg returned to Sweden, signing with Örgryte IS on a one-year contract.

Personal life
Qwiberg was born in Colombia but adopted by a Swedish family as a baby. This background was one of the reasons he elected to move his career to the United States in 2018, so that he could be closer to Colombian culture, learn Spanish alongside his Spanish-speaking teammates at San Jose, and become a part of the city's large Hispanic community.

Statistics

References

External links
Earthquakes bio

1992 births
Living people
Colombian emigrants to Sweden
Swedish adoptees
Association football defenders
Swedish footballers
FC Gute players
FC Den Bosch players
Vasalunds IF players
IF Brommapojkarna players
Superettan players
San Jose Earthquakes players
Reno 1868 FC players
Örgryte IS players
Swedish expatriate footballers
Expatriate footballers in the Netherlands
Swedish expatriate sportspeople in the Netherlands
Expatriate soccer players in the United States
Swedish expatriate sportspeople in the United States
Swedish people of Colombian descent
Naturalized citizens of Sweden
Major League Soccer players
USL Championship players